Kosmoclymeniidae is a family in the ammonoid order Clymeniida. They were fast-moving nektonic carnivores.

Subfamilies and genera
 Kosmoclymeniinae Korn and Price 1987
 Kosmoclymenia Schindewolf 1949
 Linguaclymenia Korn and Price 1987
 Lissoclymenia Korn and Price 1987
 Muessenbiaergia Korn and Price 1987
 Rodeckiinae Korn 2002
 Franconiclymenia Korn and Price 1987
 Protoxyclymenia Schindewolf 1923
 Rodeckia Korn 2002

Distribution
Fossils of species within this family have been found in the Devonian of Austria, China. Germany and Morocco.

References
 The Paleobiology Database

Devonian ammonites
Late Devonian first appearances
Late Devonian animals
Famennian extinctions
Ammonite families
Clymeniina